The 1997 European Grand Prix (formally the XLII European Grand Prix) was a Formula One motor race held on 26 October 1997 at the Circuito Permanente de Jerez, Spain. Originally scheduled as the Grand Prix of Portugal at the Estoril circuit, it was moved when Estoril's management had financial difficulties. It was the 17th and final race of the 1997 FIA Formula One World Championship. The 69-lap race was won by Mika Häkkinen in a McLaren, his first Formula One race victory. His teammate David Coulthard finished second and Williams driver Jacques Villeneuve took third, which was sufficient for him to win the World Championship.

Michael Schumacher, driving for Ferrari, had led the championship by a single point ahead of Villeneuve going into the race. During the race, Villeneuve and Schumacher collided while battling for the lead and the resulting damage to Schumacher's car forced him to retire. The blame for the incident was later attributed to Schumacher by the sport's governing body, the FIA, and he was stripped of his second-place finish in the championship. Schumacher's tactics were widely criticised by the media, including publications based in his home country of Germany, and in Ferrari's home country of Italy.

Following the race, Williams and McLaren were accused of colluding to decide the finishing order. Villeneuve stated that "it was better to let them through and win the World Championship". The FIA determined there was no evidence to support the claims, and dismissed the accusations. This is the last World Championship Grand Prix to be held in Jerez to date. Hakkinen's victory was the first victory for a Finnish driver in the Formula One World Championship in 12 years since Keke Rosberg won the 1985 Australian Grand Prix.  Hakkinen and Coulthard's first and second place finishes ensured the McLaren team scored their first one-two finish since the 1991 Japanese Grand Prix.  This was the last race for Gerhard Berger who had won 10 times and had been competing in F1 since 1984 and Ukyo Katayama. This was also the last Grand Prix until the 2009 Australian Grand Prix where slick tyres were used as grooved tyres would be used in the sport from the start of the 1998 season until the end of the 2008 season.

Background
The 1997 European Grand Prix was the final round of the 1997 Formula One World Championship and occurred at the  Circuito de Jerez on 26 October 1997. Originally scheduled as the Grand Prix of Portugal at the Estoril Circuit, the race was moved to the Jerez Circuit when Estoril's management had financial difficulties. The race was added to the schedule after Japan because engine suppliers Renault did not want their last Formula One race to be in Japan.
 
Heading into the final race of the season, two drivers were still in contention for the World Drivers' Championship. Ferrari driver Michael Schumacher was leading with 78 points; Williams driver Jacques Villeneuve was second with 77 points, one point behind Schumacher. Behind Schumacher and Villeneuve in the Drivers' Championship, Heinz-Harald Frentzen was third on 41 points in the other Williams, with Jean Alesi and David Coulthard on 36 and 30 points respectively. Villeneuve had won two more races than Schumacher during the season, meaning that in the event of a tie on points, the rules stated Villeneuve would be world champion.

Villeneuve had to finish the race in a points-scoring position (points were awarded for drivers finishing in sixth place or higher) and ahead of Schumacher to become World Drivers' Champion. Schumacher would be world champion if he finished ahead of Villeneuve, or if Villeneuve failed to score any points by finishing lower than sixth or not completing the race.

In the World Constructors' Championship, Williams led with 118 points and Ferrari were second on 100. Williams had therefore clinched the constructors' title before the race, as even if Ferrari finished first and second in the race, thereby taking 16 points, and both Williams cars failed to score a point, they could not beat Williams.

Following the Japanese Grand Prix on 12 October, the teams conducted testing sessions at various locations around the world. Williams, Benetton, Sauber, Jordan and McLaren conducted at a test session at the Silverstone Circuit. Williams, Sauber and Jordan tested using 1998-spec cars, in preparation for the  season. Arrows conducted testing at the Circuit de Nevers Magny-Cours circuit, performing wet weather tyre development with tyre suppliers Bridgestone with the circuit flooded to simulate wet weather conditions. Prost conducted testing at Circuit de Catalunya and performed tyre testing for Bridgestone, as well as testing their 1998-specification car. Ferrari remained at the Suzuka Circuit testing an electronic differential used by driver Eddie Irvine at the previous race.

Practice and qualifying
Four practice sessions were held before the Sunday race—two on Friday from 11:00 to 12:00 and 13:00 to 14:00 CEST (UTC+2), and two on Saturday morning held from 09:00 to 09:45 and from 10:15 to 11:00 CEST. In the first two practice sessions, Prost driver Olivier Panis set the fastest time with a lap of 1 minute and 22.735 seconds, one-tenth of a second faster than Arrows driver Damon Hill. Villeneuve and Rubens Barrichello were third and fourth. Mika Häkkinen and Coulthard, set the fifth and eighth-fastest times respectively for McLaren; they were separated by Frentzen and Alesi. Michael Schumacher and Ralf Schumacher completed the top ten.

In the final two practice sessions, Coulthard set the fastest lap with a time of 1:20.738; Häkkinen finished with the second-fastest time. The Williams drivers were quicker—Villeneuve in third and Frentzen in sixth. Panis slipped to fourth ahead of Gerhard Berger, their best times one-tenth of a second apart. They were ahead of Stewart driver Jan Magnussen, Shinji Nakano for Prost, Hill and Alesi.

The qualifying session was held on Saturday afternoon and lasted one-hour between 13:00 to 14:00 CEST, each driver was allowed up to twelve timed laps, with their fastest lap used to determine their grid position. Cars were timed using a TAG Heuer timing system, which measured to an accuracy of one-thousandth of a second. At the end of the session, the three fastest drivers had all set the same laptime, the first time this had happened in the history of the World Championship. Jacques Villeneuve was first to set a time of 1:21.072, fourteen minutes into the one hour session. A further fourteen minutes later, Michael Schumacher posted an identical time. With nine minutes of the session remaining, Heinz-Harald Frentzen crossed the line, again with a time of 1:21.072. Under the regulations, in the event of drivers setting equal times in qualifying, the order in which the times were set is considered, with the first driver to set the time given precedence. Villeneuve was awarded pole position on the starting grid for the race, with Schumacher second and Frentzen third. Fourth place on the grid went to the reigning World Champion, Hill, in his Arrows, with a time of 1:21.130, 0.058 seconds behind the time of the leading three. Hill had been on course to get pole position but had to slow towards the end of the lap because of yellow flags due to an incident involving Ukyo Katayama's Minardi. Villeneuve's pole position was the last for a Canadian driver in Formula One until Lance Stroll at the 2020 Turkish Grand Prix.

Qualifying classification

Warm-up 
A half an hour warm-up session took place on Sunday morning for teams to set-up their cars for the race later that day. A majority of the teams appeared to use the soft compound tyres except for Jordan who were using the harder tyre compound. Häkkinen lapped fastest with a time of 1:23.016 ahead of Berger in second position and Panis in third. The top ten was completed by Coulthard, Villeneuve, Herbert, Michael Schumacher, Frentzen, Nakano and Hill. There were no incidents during the session.

Race
The race took place in the afternoon, starting at 14:00 CET (UTC+1), in dry and sunny weather. Villeneuve started the race in pole position, with Schumacher in second. Just a few moments before the start of the race, a blue liquid came out of Villeneuve's Williams. However, this did not influence his car during the race. Schumacher's getaway at the start was better than Villeneuve's and he had taken the lead by the time they reached the first corner. Schumacher led 40 of the first 47 laps of the race. Frentzen also got a better start than Villeneuve and overtook him for second position. Under the orders of the Williams team, on lap eight Frentzen let teammate Villeneuve past. On the 12th lap, Pedro Diniz's race ended early when he spun and stalled. Schumacher made his first pit-stop on lap 22 and Villeneuve made his first stop the following lap. Both retained their positions. During the first round of pitstops the McLarens swapped places with Coulthard leading Häkkinen and Frentzen dropped to fifth position behind both of them. The order of the leaders after the second round of pit stops on lap 43 and lap 44 remained the same but with Villeneuve closer to Schumacher.

Villeneuve went into lap 48 less than a second behind Schumacher. Partway through the lap he attempted to overtake Schumacher at the sharp, right-hand Dry Sac corner. Braking later than Schumacher, Villeneuve held the inside line and was ahead on the track when Schumacher turned in on him resulting in a collision with his front-right wheel and Villeneuve's left-hand sidepod. ITV's pit lane reporter James Allen has noted that onboard footage shows Schumacher twitching his steering wheel left before turning right into Villeneuve. Martin Brundle, in the commentary box alongside Murray Walker, immediately saw that Schumacher's move had been deliberate, saying, "That didn't work Michael. You hit the wrong part of him, my friend". The right-front wheel of Schumacher's Ferrari hit the left radiator pod of Villeneuve's Williams—unlike the 1994 collision with Hill where Schumacher inflicted damage on Hill's suspension—and caused Schumacher to retire. Villeneuve described the incident after the race "The car felt very strange. The hit was very hard. It was not a small thing." He continued but the damage to the mounts on his car's battery meant he was slower than the cars behind him.

At the time of the incident there were 22 laps of the race remaining. The slower pace of Villeneuve's car meant that on the last lap, he had been caught by both McLarens, Häkkinen having regained second place from Coulthard under team orders. After the race Villeneuve stated "I did not fight then. It was better to let them through and win the World Championship. It is a good exchange." Berger in fourth place (in what transpired to be his final Grand Prix) was also catching Villeneuve but he did not pass before crossing the finish line. The final margin between Villeneuve and Berger was 0.116 seconds. Villeneuve later said that had he realised that it was Berger behind him, he would have let him through so that Berger would have finished on the podium in his last race. Third place meant Villeneuve finished ahead of Schumacher in the Drivers' Championship by three points, and became World Champion. Häkkinen's victory was the first of his career.

Race classification

Post-race

Schumacher/Villeneuve collision

Before the race at Jerez, the president of the FIA, Max Mosley, had promised to issue penalties to anyone who tried to influence the outcome of the championship. Race stewards reviewed video footage of the collision between Villeneuve and Michael Schumacher and determined that it was "a racing incident" and took no further action against Schumacher. However, Schumacher was subsequently summoned to a disciplinary hearing by the FIA and on 11 November 1997, it was announced that Schumacher would be disqualified from the 1997 World Championship. This meant he lost his second place in the overall standings to Frentzen but he would retain his race victories and other results and would not be fined or face any further punishment in the following season. Max Mosley stated that the panel "concluded that although the actions were deliberate they were not premeditated". Schumacher was also ordered to take part in a road-safety campaign during the 1998 season.

Ferrari also escaped unpunished despite Article 123 of the FIA International Sporting Code stating: "The entrant shall be responsible for all acts or omissions on the part of the driver." Under this rule, which has never been invoked for a driving incident, Ferrari could have been punished for failing to control its driver. When questioned on the subject Max Mosley said that the World Council had decided not to invoke Article 123. Another question which the World Council failed to address was whether or not there would be any public sanction against the stewards at Jerez, who had dismissed the Schumacher-Villeneuve incident, which, has been claimed, was a dereliction of their duty.

Media reaction
The German newspapers were among the many from across Europe that criticised Schumacher. Bild blamed Schumacher, saying "he played for high stakes and lost everything – the World Championship and his reputation for fair play. There is no doubt that he wanted to take out Villeneuve." The Frankfurter Allgemeine called him "a kamikaze without honour" and alluded to a "monument [that] is starting to crack because the foundations are faulty". A German television channel polled 63,081 fans and found that 28% no longer felt they could support Schumacher.

In Italy Schumacher was widely condemned. The daily newspaper l'Unità felt that Schumacher deserved to be sacked for bringing shame to Italian sport, and said that "Schumacher ought to face charges in a Spanish court for the grave deed he committed". La Repubblica said that "seeing a world title vanish after waiting 18 years is sad enough. But to see it go up in smoke with the move from Michael Schumacher is unfortunately much worse. It's shameful." Gazzetta dello Sport said they would prefer to wait for Ferrari to win a title in circumstances which wouldn't render it "a title to hide". Despite being owned by the Agnelli family, which also controlled Ferrari, La Stampa said "His image as a champion was shattered".

In England, Schumacher's manoeuvre against Damon Hill at the 1994 Australian Grand Prix was used as a comparison in many media reports. The Times wrote that Schumacher had "sacrificed his reputation by an act of such cynicism that it lost him the right to any sympathy".  The BBC pointed to Schumacher's "history of being involved in controversial collisions", saying the German driver had a "chequered record" and claiming the 1990 Macau Grand Prix and 1991 Nürburgring 430 kilometres as other instances of previous Schumacher controversy. The public broadcaster also posited that the affair "left Formula One's glamorous image in a poor light." The Independent noted that "many observers remain convinced Schumacher and Ferrari, major attractions in the Formula One show, have been given preferential treatment". In 2006, nine years after the incident, The Guardian would cite it as an example of Schumacher's "ruthlessness".

In the Australian telecast of the race, former world champion Alan Jones stated that there was “no doubt in [his] mind that Schumacher deliberately drove into the side of him to have him off, à la Damon Hill at Adelaide”, while co-commentator Darrell Eastlake said that it's "not the way the world championship should have been decided and viewers around the world would be disappointed with that sort of act” and his "credibility falls away a bit”.

Ferrari hosted a press conference on the Tuesday after Jerez during which Schumacher admitted that he had made a mistake but said it was a misjudgment rather than a deliberate attempt to take out Villeneuve. "I am human like everyone else and unfortunately I made a mistake," he said. "I don't make many but I did this time."

In their respective books on Schumacher, James Allen and Swiss motorsports author Luc Domenjoz have both since expressed the view that Villeneuve went into the corner too fast, and without Schumacher turning into him would have overshot the turn.

Jerez circuit
On 12 December 1997, the World Motorsport Council ruled that the mayor of Jerez, Pedro Pacheco, disrupted the podium ceremony. Originally, the verdict was that no further Formula One races would occur at the track. However, when Mr Pacheco appeared before the WMSC, this ruling was rescinded.

The people chosen to present the trophies were dependent on the race order, with Daimler-Benz chairman Jürgen Schrempp only willing to make a presentation to a McLaren-Mercedes driver. As the McLarens of Häkkinen and Coulthard passed Villeneuve's Williams on the last lap, this would have meant he could present either the trophy for first or second position or the winning constructor trophy. There was some confusion due to the late changes in position and whilst the Mayor and the president of the region presented trophies, Schrempp did nothing. FIA president Max Mosley later announced "The disruption caused embarrassment and inconvenience to those presenting the trophies and therefore, no further rounds of the FIA Formula 1 World Championship will be held at the Jerez circuit." , this race was the last time that Jerez hosted a Formula One Grand Prix, although it has held many pre-season test days.

Collusion allegations

On 8 November, The Times newspaper published an article accusing Williams and McLaren of colluding to decide the finishing order at the end of the Grand Prix. The article's claims were based on recordings of the radio transmissions made by the two teams. The FIA World Council rejected the claims when the matter was brought before them. FIA president Max Mosley stated "It is quite clear that the result of the race was not fixed. There was no arrangement between McLaren and Williams that Mika Häkkinen was going to win. They were able to demonstrate very clearly that was not the case."

In 2006, Norberto Fontana claimed in an interview with the Argentinian newspaper Olé that a few hours before the Grand Prix the Ferrari team director Jean Todt visited the Sauber motorhome and told the Swiss team, which used Ferrari engines at the time, that the Saubers must block Villeneuve if they were in a position to do so in order to help Michael Schumacher win the World Championship. The Sauber team owner and manager at the time, Peter Sauber has however denied these allegations and said "Ferrari never expressed the desire that we should obstruct an opponent of Schumacher on the track."

In 2014, David Coulthard gave an interview to Charles Bradley in Autosport where he stated that indeed an agreement between McLaren and Williams was in place: "Ron [Dennis] had made that deal with Frank [Williams], which none of us knew anything about, that if we helped Williams in their quest to beat Ferrari they wouldn't get in the way of helping McLaren. Ron would probably still deny it today. That's what happened."

Championship standings after the race

Drivers'   Championship standings

Constructors'   Championship standings

 Note:   Only the top five positions are included for both sets of standings. Drivers' Championship standings accurate as at final declaration of race results. Michael Schumacher was subsequently disqualified from the championship, although his points and results remain on record.
 Bold text indicates the World Champions.

References

European Grand Prix
European Grand Prix
Formula One controversies
European Grand Prix
European Grand Prix